Héritier Bora Deyonge (born 9 January 2002) is a Belgian professional footballer who plays as a defender for Dutch club Heracles Almelo.

Career
In 2019, Deyonge signed for Olympique Lyonnais.

In 2020, he was sent on loan to Jong FC Utrecht in the Eerste Divisie, the second tier of Dutch football.

On 27 July 2022, Deyonge returned to Eerste Divisie and signed a one-year contract with Heracles Almelo.

References

External links
 

2002 births
People from Ottignies-Louvain-la-Neuve
Living people
Belgian footballers
Association football defenders
Olympique Lyonnais players
Jong FC Utrecht players
Heracles Almelo players
Championnat National 2 players
Eerste Divisie players
Belgian expatriate footballers
Expatriate footballers in France
Belgian expatriate sportspeople in France
Expatriate footballers in the Netherlands
Belgian expatriate sportspeople in the Netherlands
Footballers from Walloon Brabant